The 22625 / 22626 Chennai–Bangalore AC Double Decker Express  is a Double Decker Express connecting  and . It is the 1st AC Double Decker Express in South India.

This train uses LHB coach. A Royapuram WAP-7 & Arakkonam WAP-4 locomotive, which are the powerful passenger electric locomotives of Indian Railways, is used to haul it. WAP-7 number 30332 of Royapuram Electric Loco Shed hauled the Inaugural Special.

Accommodations

This train comprises AC double decker chair car 10 & 2 luggage/parcel and generator cum brake van which is provided with the guards' cabin. Total coach composition is 12.

Coach composition
The train has 10 AC Chair cars, 2 power cars (Total 12 coaches).

References

Double-decker trains of India
Rail transport in Karnataka
Rail transport in Tamil Nadu
Transport in Bangalore
Transport in Chennai